Dasymetopa lutulenta is a species of ulidiid or picture-winged fly in the genus Dasymetopa of the family Tephritidae.

References

Dasymetopa